The Battle of Tsaritsyn was decisive confrontation between the Imperial Russian Army, commanded by Johann von Michelsohnen, and serf rebels, led by Yemelyan Pugachev. After Pugachev's victory in the Kazan, Michelsohnen was tasked with the suppression of the revolt, which occurred on August 21, 1774 near Tsaritsyn although the rebels outnumbered his forces. Afterward, the rebellion quickly collapsed. Pugachev himself escaped but was captured on September 14 and executed on January 10 the next year.

References

History of Tatarstan
Kazan
History of Kazan
Conflicts in 1774
18th-century military history of the Russian Empire
1774 in the Russian Empire
Pugachev's Rebellion